TaleSpin is a scrolling shooter video game based on the Disney television series TaleSpin. The game was developed by Capcom for the NES in 1991 and was ported to the Game Boy in 1992. The Game Boy version is essentially a slightly stripped-down version of the game.

The NES version of the game was included in The Disney Afternoon Collection compilation for PC, PlayStation 4, and Xbox One in April 2017.

Plot
Baloo and Kit are delivering cargo for Rebecca Cunningham, Shere Khan hires the Air Pirates, led by Don Karnage, in an attempt to sabotage their business.

Gameplay
The gameplay consists of maneuvering Baloo's plane "The Seaduck" through each level, fending off incoming enemies and avoiding obstacles. Items can be collected for extra lives or to add to the total cash score. The plane can be rotated upside to traverse back through the level, but only on horizontally scrolling areas. At the end of each level, the player is required to fight a boss enemy by repeatedly shooting its weak points. After beating a level, the player has the option to buy upgrades for Baloo's plane with the money collected, before proceeding to the next level. In bonus levels the player controls Kit on an airfoil to pop balloons for bonus points.

Reception

Super Gamer magazine gave the Game Boy version a review score of 65%, stating, "Quite a tricky shoot-'em-up this. Features characters from the cartoon, but certainly wouldn't appeal to younger players when it's this difficult".

See also
 List of Disney video games

References

External links
 

1991 video games
Disney games by Capcom
Disney video games
Game Boy games
Nintendo Entertainment System games
Platform games
TaleSpin
Video games about bears
Video games based on television series
Video games developed in Japan
The Jungle Book (Disney) video games